Drawida is a genus of annelids belonging to the family Moniligastridae.

The species of this genus are found in Southern Asia and Malesia.

Species:

Drawida abscisa 
Drawida aculeata 
Drawida affinis 
Drawida agricola 
Drawida alishanensis 
Drawida ampullacea 
Drawida ancisa 
Drawida annamensis 
Drawida annandalei 
Drawida aruna 
Drawida assamensis 
Drawida barwelli 
Drawida beiganica 
Drawida bifida 
Drawida bimaculata 
Drawida bodgarti 
Drawida brunnea 
Drawida bullata 
Drawida burchardi 
Drawida cacharensis 
Drawida caenosa 
Drawida caerula
Drawida caerulea 
Drawida calebi 
Drawida chalakudiana 
Drawida changbaishanensis 
Drawida chapaensis 
Drawida cheni 
Drawida cheni 
Drawida circumpapillatus 
Drawida companio 
Drawida constricta 
Drawida coonoorensis 
Drawida decourcyi 
Drawida delicata 
Drawida dolosa 
Drawida dongyinica 
Drawida duttai 
Drawida eda 
Drawida elegans 
Drawida exilis 
Drawida fakir 
Drawida fausta 
Drawida fenqihuensis 
Drawida ferina 
Drawida flexa 
Drawida fluviatilis 
Drawida fucosa 
Drawida ghatensis 
Drawida ghilarovi 
Drawida gisti 
Drawida glabella 
Drawida gracilis 
Drawida grahami 
Drawida guryeensis 
Drawida hatai 
Drawida hattamimizu 
Drawida hattamlnizu 
Drawida heterochaetus 
Drawida hodgarti 
Drawida impertusa
Drawida iucn 
Drawida jalpaigurensis 
Drawida jeholensis 
Drawida jirisanensis 
Drawida kamakuraensis 
Drawida kambarai 
Drawida kanarensis 
Drawida keikiensis 
Drawida kempi 
Drawida koreana 
Drawida lacertosa 
Drawida langsonensis 
Drawida lennora 
Drawida limella 
Drawida linhaiensis 
Drawida longatria 
Drawida loricata 
Drawida malayana 
Drawida matthaii 
Drawida minutus 
Drawida modesta 
Drawida molesta 
Drawida montana 
Drawida moriokaensis 
Drawida mysorensis 
Drawida nagana 
Drawida nandiensis 
Drawida nemora 
Drawida nepalensis 
Drawida ofunatoensis 
Drawida omeiana 
Drawida papillifer 
Drawida paradoxa 
Drawida parambikulamana 
Drawida peguana 
Drawida pellucida 
Drawida periodiosa 
Drawida periodosa 
Drawida polydiverticulata 
Drawida pomella 
Drawida propatula 
Drawida ramnadana 
Drawida rangamatiana 
Drawida rangoonensis 
Drawida rara 
Drawida raui 
Drawida robusta 
Drawida rosea 
Drawida rotungana 
Drawida sapphirinoides 
Drawida scandens 
Drawida schunkarai 
Drawida sepulta 
Drawida setosus 
Drawida sinica 
Drawida somavarpatana 
Drawida songae 
Drawida spissata 
Drawida sulcata 
Drawida sulcata 
Drawida syringa 
Drawida tairaensis 
Drawida tecta 
Drawida tenellula 
Drawida thomasi 
Drawida thurstoni 
Drawida thurtoni 
Drawida tihenensis 
Drawida tihunensis 
Drawida torini 
Drawida toriui 
Drawida tosaensis 
Drawida travancorense 
Drawida travancorensis 
Drawida troglodytes 
Drawida tumida 
Drawida victoriana 
Drawida vulgaris 
Drawida willsi 
Drawida zhangetalia

References

Clitellata
Annelid genera